An election to Shetland Islands Council was held on 6 May 1982 as part of the 1982 Scottish regional elections and yielded a swing to candidates supportive of Home Rule for the islands. Whilst no candidates appeared on the ballot as members of the Shetland Movement (all Shetland candidates were independents), the Shetland Movement did publish a list of candidates supportive of Shetland Home Rule. Ultimately of the 25 members of the Shetland council, 14 were supporters of the movement.

Supporters of Island Autonomy similarly contested the elections in neighboring Orkney.

The councils for the Shetland Islands, Orkney, and the Western Isles operated as combined authorities, meaning that instead of having both regional and district governance, the Islands had a single level combined of governance. These councils were elected at the same time as Scottish regional councils.

Aggregate results

Ward results

By-elections since 1982

References

1982
Shetland
May 1982 events in the United Kingdom